This article includes a list of the most massive known objects of the Solar System and partial lists of smaller objects by observed mean radius. These lists can be sorted according to an object's radius and mass and, for the most massive objects, volume, density, and surface gravity, if these values are available.

These lists contain the Sun, the planets, dwarf planets, many of the larger small Solar System bodies (which includes the asteroids), all named natural satellites, and a number of smaller objects of historical or scientific interest, such as comets and near-Earth objects.

Many trans-Neptunian objects (TNOs) have been discovered; in many cases their positions in this list are approximate, as there is frequently a large uncertainty in their estimated diameters due to their distance from Earth.

Solar System objects more massive than 1021 kilograms are known or expected to be approximately spherical. Astronomical bodies relax into rounded shapes (spheroids), achieving hydrostatic equilibrium, when their own gravity is sufficient to overcome the structural strength of their material. It was believed that the cutoff for round objects is somewhere between 100 km and 200 km in radius if they have a large amount of ice in their makeup; however, later studies revealed that icy satellites as large as Iapetus (1,470 kilometers in diameter) are not in hydrostatic equilibrium at this time, and a 2019 assessment suggests that many TNOs in the size range of 400–1,000 kilometers may not even be fully solid bodies, much less gravitationally rounded. Objects that are ellipsoids due to their own gravity are here generally referred to as being "round", whether or not they are actually in equilibrium today, while objects that are clearly not ellipsoidal are referred to as being "irregular."

Spheroidal bodies typically have some polar flattening due to the centrifugal force from their rotation, and can sometimes even have quite different equatorial diameters (scalene ellipsoids such as ). Unlike bodies such as Haumea, the irregular bodies have a significantly non-ellipsoidal profile, often with sharp edges.

There can be difficulty in determining the diameter (within a factor of about 2) for typical objects beyond Saturn. (See 2060 Chiron as an example) For TNOs there is some confidence in the diameters, but for non-binary TNOs there is no real confidence in the masses/densities. Many TNOs are often just assumed to have Pluto's density of 2.0 g/cm3, but it is just as likely that they have a comet-like density of only 0.5 g/cm3.

For example, if a TNO is incorrectly assumed to have a mass of 3.59 kg based on a radius of 350 km with a density of 2 g/cm3 but is later discovered to have a radius of only 175 km with a density of 0.5 g/cm3, its true mass would be only 1.12 kg.

The sizes and masses of many of the moons of Jupiter and Saturn are fairly well known due to numerous observations and interactions of the Galileo and Cassini orbiters; however, many of the moons with a radius less than ~100 km, such as Jupiter's Himalia, have far less certain masses. Further out from Saturn, the sizes and masses of objects are less clear. There has not yet been an orbiter around Uranus or Neptune for long-term study of their moons. For the small outer irregular moons of Uranus, such as Sycorax, which were not discovered by the Voyager 2 flyby, even different NASA web pages, such as the National Space Science Data Center and JPL Solar System Dynamics, give somewhat contradictory size and albedo estimates depending on which research paper is being cited.

There are uncertainties in the figures for mass and radius, and irregularities in the shape and density, with accuracy often depending on how close the object is to Earth or whether it has been visited by a probe.

Graphical overview

Objects with radius over 400 km
The following objects have a mean radius of at least 400 km. It was once expected that any icy body larger than approximately 200 km in radius was likely to be in hydrostatic equilibrium (HE). However,  (r = 470 km) is the smallest body for which detailed measurements are consistent with hydrostatic equilibrium, whereas Iapetus (r = 735 km) is the largest icy body that has been found to not be in hydrostatic equilibrium. The known icy moons in this range are all ellipsoidal (except Proteus), but trans-Neptunian objects up to 450–500 km radius may be quite porous.

For simplicity and comparative purposes, the values are manually calculated assuming that the bodies are all spheres. The size of solid bodies does not include an object's atmosphere. For example, Titan looks bigger than Ganymede, but its solid body is smaller. For the giant planets, the "radius" is defined as the distance from the center at which the atmosphere reaches 1 bar of atmospheric pressure.

Smaller objects by mean radius

From 200 to 399 km 
All imaged icy moons with radii greater than 200 km except Proteus are clearly round, although those under 400 km that have had their shapes carefully measured are not in hydrostatic equilibrium. The known densities of TNOs in this size range are remarkably low, implying that the objects retain significant internal porosity from their formation and were never gravitationally compressed into fully solid bodies.

From 100 to 199 km 
This list contains a selection of objects estimated to be between 100 and 199 km in radius (200 and 399 km in diameter). The largest of these may have a hydrostatic-equilibrium shape, but most are irregular. Most of the trans-Neptunian objects (TNOs) listed with a radius smaller than 200 km have "assumed sizes based on a generic albedo of 0.09" since they are too far away to directly measure their sizes with existing instruments. Mass switches from 1021 kg to 1018 kg (Zg). Main-belt asteroids have orbital elements constrained by (2.0 AU < a < 3.2 AU; q > 1.666 AU) according to JPL Solar System Dynamics (JPLSSD). Many TNOs are omitted from this list as their sizes are poorly known.

From 50 to 99 km 
This list contains a selection of objects 50 and 99 km in radius (100 km to 199 km in average diameter). The listed objects currently include most objects in the asteroid belt and moons of the giant planets in this size range, but many newly discovered objects in the outer Solar System are missing, such as those included in the following reference. Asteroid spectral types are mostly Tholen, but some might be SMASS.

From 20 to 49 km 
This list includes few examples since there are about 589 asteroids in the asteroid belt with a measured radius between 20 and 49 km. Many thousands of objects of this size range have yet to be discovered in the trans-Neptunian region. The number of digits is not an endorsement of significant figures. The table switches from  kg to  kg (Eg). Most mass values of asteroids are assumed.

From 1 to 19 km 
This list contains some examples of Solar System objects between 1 and 19 km in radius. This is a common size for asteroids, comets and irregular moons.

Below 1 km 

This list contains examples of objects below 1 km in radius. That means that irregular bodies can have a longer chord in some directions, hence the mean radius averages out.
In the asteroid belt alone there are estimated to be between 1.1 and 1.9 million objects with a radius above 0.5 km, many of which are in the range 0.5–1.0 km. Countless more have a radius below 0.5 km.
Very few objects in this size range have been explored or even imaged. The exceptions are objects that have been visited by a probe, or have passed close enough to Earth to be imaged. Radius is by mean geometric radius. Number of digits not an endorsement of significant figures. Mass scale shifts from × 1015 to 109 kg, which is equivalent to one billion kg or 1012 grams (Teragram – Tg).
Currently most of the objects of mass between 109 kg to 1012 kg (less than 1000 teragrams (Tg)) listed here are near-Earth asteroids (NEAs). The Aten asteroid  has less mass than the Great Pyramid of Giza, 5.9 × 109 kg.
For more about very small objects in the Solar System, see meteoroid, micrometeoroid, cosmic dust, and interplanetary dust cloud. (See also Visited/imaged bodies.)

Gallery

See also 
 List of gravitationally rounded objects of the Solar System
 List of dwarf planets
 List of minor planets
 List of natural satellites
 List of near-Earth asteroids by distance from Sun
 List of Solar System objects most distant from the Sun
 List of space telescopes
 Lists of astronomical objects

Notes

References

Further reading 
 NASA Planetary Data System (PDS)
 Asteroids with Satellites
 Minor Planet discovery circumstances
 Supplemental IRAS Minor Planet Survey (SIMPS) and IRAS Minor Planet Survey (IMPS)
 SIMPS & IMPS (V6, additional, from here)
 Asteroid Data Archive  Archive Planetary Science Institute

External links 
 Planetary fact sheets
 Asteroid fact sheet

Size